Outlive is the eighth studio album from American heavy metal band Demon Hunter. The album was released by Solid State Records on March 31, 2017. The work was funded through PledgeMusic, with "Cold Winter Sun" broadcast prior to the showing for all album tracks.

Musical style
In addition to the band's usual metalcore style, Metal Injection reviewer Aaron said that "as Outlive unfolds, traces of rock, death metal, groove metal, thrash metal and goth can be heard, complemented by melodic undertones that add to the accessibility and memorability of each song."

Track listing

Personnel 
Demon Hunter
 Ryan Clark – vocals
 Patrick Judge – lead guitar, gang vocals, keys
 Jeremiah Scott – rhythm guitar, production, keys
 Jon Dunn – bass
 Timothy "Yogi" Watts – drums

Additional personnel
Chris Carmichael – strings on "Slight the Odds"
 Aaron Sprinkle – additional editing, additional vocal production
 Rocky Gray – additional percussion
 Brad Hartley, Brandon Earl, Brian Shorter, Bruce Fitzhugh, Dustinn Lowry, and Stephen Schofield – gang vocals
 Bruce Fitzhugh – backing vocals
 Zeuss – mixing and mastering

Charts

References 

2017 albums
Albums produced by Aaron Sprinkle
Demon Hunter albums
Solid State Records albums